The 2019–20 TCU Horned Frogs women's basketball team represented Texas Christian University in the 2019–20 NCAA Division I women's basketball season. The 2019–20 season is head coach Raegan Pebley's sixth season at TCU. The Horned Frogs were members of the Big 12 Conference and played their home games in Schollmaier Arena.

The Horned Frogs finished the season 22–7, 13–5 in Big 12 play to finish in second place.  The Big 12 Tournament, NCAA women's basketball tournament and WNIT were all cancelled before they began due to the COVID-19 pandemic.

Previous season
The Horned Frogs finished the season 24–11, 10–8 in Big 12 play to finish in sixth place. They lost in the quarterfinals of the Big 12 women's tournament to Texas. They received an at-large bid to the Women's National Invitation Tournament where they defeated Prairie View A&M, UT Arlington, Arkansas in the first, second and third rounds, Cincinnati in the quarterfinals before losing to Arizona in the semifinals.

Roster

Schedule and results 

Source:

|-
!colspan=9 style=| Non-conference regular season

|-
!colspan=9 style=| Big 12 regular season

|-
!colspan=9 style=| Big 12 Women's Tournament

Rankings

See also 
 2019–20 TCU Horned Frogs men's basketball team

References 

TCU
TCU Horned Frogs women's basketball seasons